Michael Walker may refer to:

Arts and entertainment
 Michael Patrick Walker, American composer/lyricist
 Michael A. Walker, English writer of film and television
 Michael Walker (filmmaker) (born 1967), American filmmaker
 Michael Walker, keyboardist of Paradise Fears
 DCS Michael 'Mike' Walker, a character in the British television series Trial & Retribution

Politics
 Michael Walker (diplomat) (1916–2001), British ambassador
 Michael Walker, Baron Walker of Aldringham (born 1944), former British Chief of the Defence Staff
 Michael Walker (politician) (born 1941), Canadian politician
 Michael Walker, political journalist and commentator for Novara Media

Sports 
 Michael Walker (cyclist) (1885–1971), British Olympic cyclist
 Mickey Walker (boxer) (1901–1981), American  professional boxer in the 1920s
 Mickey Walker (American football) (1939–2014), American football player, New York Giants 1961–1966
 Mick Walker (footballer, born 1940), English football player and manager
 Mickey Walker (footballer) (born 1945), English football player and administrator
 Mickey Walker (golfer) (born 1952), English golfer
 Michael Walker (American football) (born 1996), American football player
 Michael Walker (jockey) (born 1984), New Zealand jockey
 Mike Walker (tennis) (Michael Walker), Welsh tennis player
 Michael Walker (Paralympian), British track and field athlete

Other 
 Michael Walker (economist) (born 1945), Canadian economist
 Michael Walker (knifemaker) (born 1949), knifemaker who invented the Walker Linerlock mechanism
 Michael Walker (biologist), biologist at University of Auckland
 Michael Walker (mathematician) (1947–2018), English mathematician
 Michael Walker, convicted spy and son of convicted Soviet spy and American traitor John Anthony Walker
 Michael "Pee Wee" Walker, murder victim killed by Adam Kelly Ward

See also
 Mike Walker (disambiguation)
 Mick Walker (disambiguation)